The Shangri La Museum of Islamic Art, Culture & Design is housed in the former home of Doris Duke near Diamond Head just outside Honolulu, Hawaii. It is now owned and operated as a public museum of the arts and cultures of the Islamic world by the Doris Duke Foundation for Islamic Art (DDFIA). Guided tours depart from the Honolulu Museum of Art, which operates the tours in co-operation with DDFIA.

Construction of Shangri La took place from 1936 to 1938, after Doris Duke's 1935 honeymoon which took her through the Islamic world. For nearly 60 years, Duke commissioned and collected artworks for the space, eventually forming a collection of over 4,000 objects. The structure was designed by Marion Sims Wyeth. An artistic reflection of the construction of Shangri La can be found in Kiana Davenport's novel Song of the Exile.

The building was opened to the public as a museum, the Shangri La Museum for Islamic Art, Design & Culture, in 2002. The Playhouse underwent restoration in 2006 to re-create and restore over thirty classic Islamic patterns of original painted and stenciled decoration. John Canning & Co., an architectural arts restoration company out of Cheshire, Connecticut, created seven separate stencil plates for each design, and formulated solutions that would withstand the tropical environment and conserve the original materials. The project won an Honor Award for Historic Preservation in 2007 from the Historic Hawaii Foundation.

Collections and exhibitions 

The museum displays a wide-ranging collection of art, furnishings, and built-in architectural elements from Iran, Morocco, Turkey, Spain, Syria, Egypt, and India - among others. Gilt and painted ceilings from Morocco, vivid ceramics from Iran (including the only complete lusterware Ilkhanid mihrab in North America), painted wooden interiors from Syria, pierced metalwork and vibrant textiles from Spain to India (including a magnificent pair of shaped carpets, made for the Mughal emperor) are among the many highlights. Its multiple buildings on the campus also include The Playhouse (a reduced-scale version of the 17th century Chehel Sotoun in Esfahan, Iran, now used for public programs and artist residencies).

The outdoor landscaping has a number of gardens, including a formal Mughal garden inspired by the Shalimar Gardens, as well as terraced water features, a Hawaiian fishpond, tropical gardens and a waterfall, and fabulous vistas of the Pacific Ocean.

The museum also hosts two visual artists per year for onsite exhibitions, workshops, and/or lectures. Recently-featured artists have included Hayv Kahraman, Faig Ahmed, Bahia Shehab, and Reem Bassous.

Public tours and programs 
Because it is located in a residential area with limited parking capacity, tours of Shangri La originate at the Honolulu Museum of Art, and tickets must be reserved well in advance. Individual access to the museum is not granted.

Tours last about two and a-half hours, with one and a-half hours onsite at Shangri La. Tours feature the public rooms of the museum, and portions of the grounds, Features include the Entry Courtyard with Bahia Shehab's My People mural, the Mughal Garden, the covered lānai overlooking the Pacific Ocean, and views of the Playhouse/pool/water cascades.

The museum has a calendar of public programs throughout the year, including educational activities, lectures, and performances by the artists in residence, including musicians (such as Alsarah and the Nubatones), dancers (such as Amirah Sackett), comedians (Tanzila 'Taz' Ahmed and Zahra Noorkbakhsh of Good Muslim Bad Muslim), and intellectuals (such as Dr. Lonnie Bunch).

Location
The facility sits on a  oceanfront lot in the exclusive Black Point residential neighborhood near Diamond Head, Hawaii. All tours to Shangri La begin and end at the Honolulu Museum of Art, which occupies  near downtown Honolulu.

As the museum operates under the terms of a conditional use permit from the City and County of Honolulu, visitor access is restricted. Visitors are not permitted to drive or park on-site at Shangri La or in the surrounding residential neighborhood.

References

External links 

 
 Interview: Museum Director Konrad Ng, December 2017

Houses in Honolulu County, Hawaii
Gardens in Hawaii
D
Duke family residences
Museums in Honolulu
Art museums and galleries in Hawaii
Historic house museums in Hawaii
Islamic museums
Residential buildings completed in 1938
Hawaiian architecture
Art museums established in 2002
2002 establishments in Hawaii
1938 establishments in Hawaii